Sacred groves of India are forest fragments of varying sizes, which are communally protected, and which usually have a significant religious connotation for the protecting community. Hunting and logging are usually strictly prohibited within these patches. Other forms of forest usage like honey collection and deadwood collection are sometimes allowed on a sustainable basis. NGOs work with local villagers to protect such groves. Traditionally, and in some cases even today, members of the community take turns to protect the grove. The introduction of the protected area category community reserves under the Wild Life (Protection) Amendment Act, 2002 has introduced legislation for providing government protection to community held lands, which could include sacred groves. 

Around 14,000 sacred groves have been reported from all over India, which act as reservoirs of rare fauna, and more often rare flora, amid rural and even urban settings. Experts believe that the total number of sacred groves could be as high as 100,000. Threats to the groves include urbanization, and over-exploitation of resources. While many of the groves are looked upon as abode of Hindu deities, in the recent past a number of them have been partially cleared for construction of shrines and temples. Sacred groves are places of yatra (pilgrimage) in Indian-origin religions, such as Hinduism, Buddhism, Jainism and Sikhism.

Indian sacred groves are often associated with temples, monasteries, shrines, pilgrimage sites, or with burial grounds. Historically, sacred groves find their mentions in Hindu, Jain and Buddhist texts, from sacred tree groves in Hinduism to sacred bamboo groves and sacred deer parks in Buddhism for example. Sacred groves may be loosely used to refer to natural habitat protected on religious grounds. Other historical references to sacred groves can be obtained in Vrukshayurveda an ancient treatise, ancient classics such as Kalidasa's Vikramuurvashiiya. There has been a growing interest in creating green patches such as Nakshatravana grove.

Uses of sacred groves

Traditional uses

One of the most important traditional uses of sacred groves was that it acted as a repository for various Ayurvedic medicines. Other uses involved a source of replenishable resources like fruits and honey. In most  sacred groves it was taboo to hunt or chop wood. The vegetation cover helps reduce soil erosion and prevents desertification as in Rajasthan. The groves are often associated with ponds and streams, and meet water requirements of local communities. They sometimes help in recharging aquifers as well.

Modern uses

In modern times, sacred groves have become biodiversity hotspots, as various species seek refuge in the areas due to progressive habitat destruction and hunting. Sacred groves often contain plant and animal species that have become extinct in neighboring areas. They therefore harbor great genetic diversity. Besides this, sacred groves in urban landscapes act as "lungs" to the city as well, providing much needed vegetation cover.

Religious beliefs and practices

 
Typically, sacred groves in Indian-origin religions are associated with the concept of a presiding deity. Often these sacred deities are numerous nature spirits and guardians associated with Hindu, Jain and Buddhist deities, such as nature spirits known as Yakshas (numerous nature spirits), Nāgas (serpent guardians) and guardian tutelary deities (like ayyanar and amman) are also known. There are over 1000 deities associated with sacred groves in the states of Kerala and Karnataka alone. A large number of distinct local art forms and folk traditions are associated with the deities of sacred groves, and are an important cultural aspect closely associated with sacred traditions. Ritualistic dances and dramatizations based on the local deities that protect the groves are called Theyyam in Kerala and Nagmandalam, among other names, in Karnataka. Often, elaborate rituals and traditions are associated with sacred groves, as are associated folk tales and folk mythology.

Types of sacred forests

The Hindu tradition considers forests to be of three types - Tapovan, Mahavan and Sreevan. Tapovan are forests associated with penance (Tapas), and are inhabited by saints and rishis. Mahavan refers to the grand natural forests. Tapovan and Mahavan are considered to be a Raksha ("sanctuary") for flora and fauna as ordinary human beings are not allowed to enter these forests. Sreevan, which means, "forests of the goddess of prosperity", consists of dense forests and groves. From the former, people would collect dry wood, leaves, forest produce and a limited amount of timber, though natural ecosystem would not be unnecessarily disturbed. Groves were considered as spaces of forests from where harvesting could be done. Sometimes, specific trees like mango trees could be planted and nurtured here. Groves were associated with religious rites, festivals and recreation. Typical recreational activities associated with these groves included jhoola/ jhoolan. In the villages, Panchavati, or a cluster of five trees that represented the forests, were maintained. These trees represented the five elements of Earth, Water, Fire, Air and Space.

Religious merits of planting and nurturing forests

Planting and nurturing of trees has been a highly evolved practice in ancient India. Vrukshayurveda, the science of plant life and also a 10th-century treatise of that title on the subject ascribed to Surapala, dealt with various species of trees and their growth. Verses 9-23 from this text indicate how mystical beliefs and conservation of ecology was inter-connected.

A person is honored in Vaikuntha for as many thousand years as the days they reside in a house where tulasi is grown.

And if one properly grows bilva, which pleases Lord Siva, in their family, the goddess of riches resides permanently passes on to the sons and grandsons

One who plants even a single asvattha, wherever it may be, as per the prescribed mode, goes to the abode of Hari.

One who has planted dhatri has performed several sacrifices. They has donated the earth. They would be considered a liberated soul forever.

One who plants a couple of banyan trees as per the prescribed mode would go to the abode of Siva.

After planting neem trees a person well-versed in dharma attains the abode of Sun. Indeed! One resides there for a long period.

By planting four plaksa trees a person doubtlessly obtains the fruits of Rajasuya sacrifice.

One who plants five or six mango trees attains the abode of Garuda and lives happily forever like gods.

One should plant seven palasa trees or even one. One attains the abode of Brahma and enjoys the company of gods by doing so.

One who personally plants eight udumbara trees or even prompts someone to plant them, rejoices in the lunar world

One who has planted madhuka has propitiated Parvati, has become free from diseases, and has worshipped all deities.

If one plants ksirini, dadimi, rambha, priyala, and panasa, one experiences no affliction for seven births.

One who has knowingly or unknowingly planted ambu is respected as a recluse even while staying in the house.

By planting all kinds of other trees, useful for fruits and flowers, a person gets a reward of thousand cows adorned with jewels.

By planting one asvattha, one picumanda, one nyagrodha, ten tamarind trees, the group of three, viz., kapittha, bilva, and amalaka, and five mango trees, one never visits hell.

Locations of sacred groves

Distribution of sacred groves in India 

Sacred groves are scattered all over the country, and are referred to by different names in different parts of India. Sacred groves occur in a variety of places – from scrub forests in the Thar Desert of Rajasthan maintained by the Bishnois, to rain forests in the Western Ghats of Kerala. Himachal Pradesh in the north and Kerala in the south are specifically known for their large numbers of sacred groves. The Gurjar people of Rajasthan have a unique practice of neem (Azadirachta indica) planting and worshipping as abode of God Devnarayan. Thus, a Gurjjar settlement appears like a human-inhabited sacred grove. Similarly Mangar Bani, last surviving natural forest of Delhi is protected by Gurjars of nearby area. 14,000 sacred groves have been reported from all over India, which act as reservoirs of rare fauna, and more often rare flora, amid rural and even urban settings. Experts believe that the total number of sacred groves could be as high as 100,000.

It is estimated that around 1000 km² of unexploited land is inside sacred groves. Some of the more famous groves are the kavus of Kerala, which are located in the Western Ghats and have enormous biodiversity; and the law kyntangs of Meghalaya – sacred groves associated with every village (two large groves being in Mawphlang and Mausmai) to appease the forest spirit.

Summary of number of sacred groves by states in India 

Among the largest sacred groves of India are the ones in Hariyali, near Gauchar in Chamoli District of Uttarakhand, and the Deodar grove in Shipin near Simla in Himachal Pradesh. Seeing the importance of sacred groves and other sacred natural sites in having conserved biodiversity all across the Himalayas, the intergovernmental organization ICIMOD developed and published a framework in 2016, to assess the present day significance of such sites for their integration into formal conservation and development frameworks.

All numbers are quoted from the records of the C.P.R. Environmental Education Centre of the Government of India. Starred numbers are likely to increase. The centre also maintains a complete list of identified sacred groves in India, most of which is online.

{| class="wikitable sortable plainrowheaders"
|-
! scope = "col" | State
! scope = "col" | No of groves
! scope = "col" | Local name
! scope = "col" class = "unsortable"| References
|-
| Andhra Pradesh
| 691
| Pavitraskhetralu
| Kailash C. Malhotra et al.
|-
| Arunachal Pradesh
| 65
| Gumpa forests(since attachedto monasteries)
| Dudley et al.   
|-
| Assam
| 40
| Than, Madaico
|
|- 
| Chhattisgarh
| 600*
| Sarna, Devlas,Mandar, Budhadev
|
|-
|Goa
| NA*
|
| SERBC document 
|-
| Gujarat
| 42*
|
|
|-
| Haryana
| 248
| Beed or Bid (बीड़), Bani (बणी), Bann (बण), Janglat (जंगलात), Shamlat (शामलात) 
|
|-
| Himachal Pradesh
| 329
| Dev Kothi, Devban, Bakhu Devban
|
|-
| Jharkhand
| 21*
| Sarnamore than 500 " Jaherthan" in Godda of Jharkhand
| Marine Carrin 
|-
| Karnataka
| 1424
| Devarakadu, Devkad| Gadgil et al.
|-
| Kerala
| 2000
| Kavu, Sarpa Kavu| M. Jayarajan 
|-
| Maharashtra
| 2820
| Deorai/Devrai(Pune, Ratnagiri,
Raigarh, Kolhapur Sindhudurg, Ahmednagar, Thane
districts)
| Waghchaure et al. Envis
|-
| Manipur
| 365
| Umang Lai, Gamkhap, Mauhak(sacred bambooreserves)
| Khumbongmayum et al.
|-
| Meghalaya
| 79
| Law Kyntang,Law Lyngdoh| Upadhyay et al.
|-
| Orissa
| 322*
| Jahera, Thakuramma|
|-
| Puducherry
| 108
| Kovil Kadu| Ramanujam et al.
|-
| Rajasthan
| 9*
| Oran (Jaiselmer,Jodhpur, Bikaner),Kenkri (Ajmer),Vani (Mewar),Shamlat deh, Devbani (Alwar), Jogmaya 
|
|-
| Sikkim
| 56
| Gumpa forests(since attachedto monasteries)
| S. S. Dash 
Dudley et al.
|-
| Tamil Nadu
| 503
| Kovil Kadu| M. Amrithalingam 
|-
| Telangana
| 65
| 
| Kailash C. Malhotra et al.
|-
| Uttarakhand
| 18*
| Devbhumi, Baun, Bugyal(sacred alpinemeadows)
| Anthwal et al.
|-
| West Bengal
| 670*
| Garamthan, Harithan,Jahera, Sabitrithan,Santalburithan| R. K. Bhakat 
|}

Select examples of sacred groves 

 Sarpa Kavu: A Sarpakkavu or Snake Grove is a kind of holy grove found in Kerala. Kavu is the traditional name given for Sacred groves across the Malabar Coast in Kerala, South India. Kavus are notable for Theyyam, the centuries-old ritual dance.
 Umang Lai (literally, "Forest Deities"): A form of holy Sacred grove found in Manipur. There are more than 365 Umang Lais, affiliated to the ancient religion of Sanamahism, which exists in various regions scattered across the Northeastern state  of Manipur since ancient times. The holy as well as religious festival of Lai Haraoba is celebrated especially in regards of these holy sacred groves. The accounts of these holy sacred groves are found in the ancient Manipuri Manuscript named Karthong Lamlen. Interestingly, Manipur stands 8th rank among all the Indian States and 1st rank for North East India, for having highest number of sacred groves across the country.

Threats

Threats to the grove include urbanization, over-exploitation of resources (like overgrazing and excessive firewood collection), and environmental destruction due to religious practices. Other threats to the sacred groves include invasion by invasive species, like the invasive weeds Chromolaena odorata, Lantana camara and Prosopis juliflora''.

See also 

 India related
 Bodhi Tree
 Environment of India
 List of Banyan trees in India
 Sacred related 
 Sacred groves
 Sacred mountains
 Sacred natural site
 Sacred rivers
 Sacred site
 Sacred trees
 Tree hugger (disambiguation)
 Tree worship
 General
 List of types of formally designated forests
 Superlative trees

References

Further reading
 Shifting Cultivation, Sacred Groves and Conflicts in Colonial Forest Policy in the Western Ghats. M. D. Subash Chandran; Chapter Twenty-two. PDF 
 CULTURAL AND ECOLOGICAL DIMENSIONS OF SACRED GROVES IN INDIA By Kailash C. Malhotra, Yogesh Gokhale, Sudipto Chatterjee, Sanjeev Srivastava. Indian National Science Academy, New Delhi & Indira Gandhi Rashtriya Manav Sangrahalaya, Bhopal; June, 2001. Published by: Indian National Science Academy, Bhopal. Printed at : Nirmal Vijay Printer, New Delhi. PDF 
 SACRED GROVES OF INDIA : AN ANNOTATED BIBLIOGRAPHY; By Kailash C. Malhotra, Yogesh Gokhale, Ketaki Das. INDIAN NATIONAL SCIENCE ACADEMY AND DEVELOPMENT ALLIANCE; © Development Alliance, New Delhi (www.dev-alliance.com); August, 2001. PDF 
 SACRED GROVES SOURCES; ENVIS; C.P.R. Environmental Education Centre is a Centre of Excellence of the Ministry of Environment and Forests, Government of India.
 ENVIS Centre on Conservation of Ecological Heritage and Sacred Sights of India; ENVIS; C.P.R. Environmental Education Centre is a Centre of Excellence of the Ministry of Environment and Forests, Government of India. Home page 

 
Communal forests of India
Indian traditions
Sacred groves
Sacred trees in Hinduism